Sylvie Thiébaux is a French-Australian computer scientist, whose research in artificial intelligence focuses on automated planning and scheduling, diagnosis, and automated reasoning under uncertainty. She is a professor of computer science at the Australian National University, and co-editor-in-chief of the journal Artificial Intelligence.

Education and career
Thiébaux earned an engineering diploma from the Institut national des sciences appliquées de Rennes in 1991, and a master's degree from the Florida Institute of Technology in 1992. She completed a Ph.D. in 1995 at the University of Rennes 1, under the direction of Marie-Odile Cordier.

After working as a researcher for the French Institute for Research in Computer Science and Automation (INRIA) and CSIRO in Australia, she joined the Australian National University in 2001. She was affiliated as a researcher with NICTA and its successor within CSIRO, Data61, from 2003 to 2018, and directed the NICTA Canberra laboratory from 2009 to 2011.

Recognition
Thiébaux was named a Fellow of the Association for the Advancement of Artificial Intelligence in 2020, "for significant contributions to algorithms and applications of planning and scheduling, and service to the AI community".

References

External links
Home page

Year of birth missing (living people)
Living people
Australian computer scientists
Australian women computer scientists
French computer scientists
French women computer scientists
Academic staff of the Australian National University
Fellows of the Association for the Advancement of Artificial Intelligence